The 1997 French Grand Prix (formally the LXXXIII French Grand Prix) was a Formula One motor race held at Circuit de Nevers, Magny-Cours, France on 29 June 1997. It was the eighth race of the 1997 Formula One World Championship.

The 72-lap race was won from pole position by Michael Schumacher driving a Ferrari alongside Eddie Irvine who finished third, with Heinz-Harald Frentzen achieving second in a Williams-Renault. This was Schumacher's third of the season and second in succession. As a result, Schumacher had a 14-point lead in the Drivers' Championship over Jacques Villeneuve, who finished fourth in the other Williams-Renault.

Race summary
At the start, Michael Schumacher led away from pole with Frentzen in the Williams behind him all the way.  It was a bad start for Damon Hill, who lost his wing at the first corner after going off.

The race was relatively uneventful until the end when a nearby thunderstorm caused rain around the circuit. Some drivers pitted for wet tyres whilst others stayed on their dry tyres. Several drivers spun under the conditions, including Michael Schumacher. Despite his spin, Schumacher maintained his lead.

In the end, Michael crossed the line well ahead of Frentzen, but on there was a great battle was going on between Ralf Schumacher, David Coulthard and Jean Alesi. At the same time Jacques Villeneuve was attempting to reel in Eddie Irvine for the final podium spot.

Ralf Schumacher spun, losing sixth place, but as mentioned in the race notes, Michael Schumacher (who had lapped him), allowed him back through at the final corner. At the time, commentator Murray Walker said that it was a silly move. However, on the last lap Alesi pushed Coulthard straight off, costing Coulthard fifth place, thus giving Ralf Schumacher the final point because he had unlapped himself.

Meanwhile, at the last corner, Villeneuve had caught Irvine. In a desperate lunge at the final corner he spun off, rejoined, and held off Alesi at the flag.

Classification

Qualifying

Race

Championship standings after the race 

Drivers'   Championship standings

Constructors'   Championship standings

 Note:   Only the top five positions are included for both sets of standings.

References

French Grand Prix
Grand Prix
French Grand Prix
French Grand Prix